Longmen Township is a township of Lushan County in a valley on the western edge of the Sichuan Basin of Sichuan province, China, located about  northeast of the county seat. , it has six villages under its administration. On 20 April 2013, the township was the location of the epicentre of a magnitude 6.6 earthquake.

References 

Township-level divisions of Sichuan